Dezhan (also Romanized as Dazhan and Dezhen; also known as Gīlān) is a village in Zhavehrud Rural District, in the Central District of Kamyaran County, Kurdistan Province, Iran. At the 2006 census, its population was 596, in 142 families. The village are mostly populated by Kurds.

References 

Towns and villages in Kamyaran County
Kurdish settlements in Kurdistan Province